Winnertzia is a genus of gall midges and wood midges in the family Cecidomyiidae. There are more than 90 described species in Winnertzia.

Species
These 97 species belong to the genus Winnertzia:

 Winnertzia amoena Mamaev, 2006
 Winnertzia ampelophila (Felt, 1907)
 Winnertzia anomala Kieffer, 1896
 Winnertzia argentata Mamaev, 1964
 Winnertzia arizoniensis Felt, 1908
 Winnertzia asiatica Mamaev, 1963
 Winnertzia assimilata Mamaev, 1972
 Winnertzia betulicola Mamaev, 1963
 Winnertzia brachypalpa Mamaev, 1975
 Winnertzia brevipalpata Jaschhof, 2013
 Winnertzia brevis Mamaev, 2002
 Winnertzia bulbifera Mamaev, 1963
 Winnertzia cactophila (Samuelson, 1964)
 Winnertzia carpini Felt, 1907
 Winnertzia carpinicola Kieffer, 1913
 Winnertzia centralis Mamaev, 2001
 Winnertzia citrina (Kieffer, 1888)
 Winnertzia colubrifera Mamaev, 1975
 Winnertzia conorum Kieffer, 1920
 Winnertzia cornigera Mamaev, 2002
 Winnertzia corticis Kieffer, 1913
 Winnertzia curvata Panelius, 1965
 Winnertzia deserticola Mamaev, 1963
 Winnertzia detrita Mamaev, 1975
 Winnertzia discreta Mohrig & Mamaev, 1970
 Winnertzia discretella Spungis, 1992
 Winnertzia dispar Mamaev, 2002
 Winnertzia divergens Mamaev, 2002
 Winnertzia diversicornis Mamaev, 2006
 Winnertzia equestris Mamaev, 1963
 Winnertzia feralis Mamaev, 2002
 Winnertzia fungicola Felt, 1921
 Winnertzia fusca Kieffer, 1901
 Winnertzia globifera Mamaev, 1963
 Winnertzia graduata Spungis, 1992
 Winnertzia griseipennis (Loew, 1874)
 Winnertzia hikosanensis Yukawa, 1967
 Winnertzia hudsonici Felt, 1908
 Winnertzia indica Grover, 1971
 Winnertzia invisibilis Mamaev, 2001
 Winnertzia iridis Mamaev, 2002
 Winnertzia levicollis Kieffer, 1901
 Winnertzia longiptera Mamaev, 2002
 Winnertzia lugubris (Winnertz, 1853)
 Winnertzia maacki Mamaev, 1975
 Winnertzia mahensis (Kieffer, 1911)
 Winnertzia monarthra Mamaev, 1990
 Winnertzia mycetaula Mamaev, 2002
 Winnertzia nigra Mamaev, 1963
 Winnertzia nigricolor Mamaev, 2002
 Winnertzia nigripennis Kieffer, 1896
 Winnertzia obscura Kieffer, 1894
 Winnertzia obscuricornis Mamaev, 2001
 Winnertzia orientalis Grover, 1971
 Winnertzia padicola Spungis, 1992
 Winnertzia palpina Mamaev, 2006
 Winnertzia palustris Felt, 1915
 Winnertzia parvispina Jaschhof, 2013
 Winnertzia pectinulata Mamaev, 1975
 Winnertzia peramoena Mamaev, 2006
 Winnertzia photophila Jaiswal, 2005
 Winnertzia pictipes (Kieffer, 1896)
 Winnertzia pinicola Kieffer, 1913
 Winnertzia pinicorticis Felt, 1907
 Winnertzia plastica Fedotova & Sidorenko, 2005
 Winnertzia populicola Spungis, 1992
 Winnertzia pravdini Mamaeva & Mamaev, 1971
 Winnertzia proxima Kieffer, 1894
 Winnertzia quercicola Kieffer, 1913
 Winnertzia regia Mamaev, 2002
 Winnertzia rotundata Spungis, 1992
 Winnertzia rubida Felt, 1908
 Winnertzia rubra Kieffer, 1894
 Winnertzia rubricola Mamaev, 1963
 Winnertzia salicis (Bouché, 1834)
 Winnertzia sequentis Mamaev, 2001
 Winnertzia solidaginis Felt, 1907
 Winnertzia striaticollis Kieffer, 1901
 Winnertzia subglobifera Mamaev, 2006
 Winnertzia sublongiptera Mamaev, 2002
 Winnertzia tamariciphila Mamaev, 1963
 Winnertzia tarsata Mamaev, 2002
 Winnertzia tenella (Walker, 1856)
 Winnertzia triangulifera Mamaev, 2001
 Winnertzia tridens Panelius, 1965
 Winnertzia tumida Panelius, 1965
 Winnertzia ussurica Mamaev, 1975
 Winnertzia vexans (Kieffer, 1913)
 † Winnertzia affinis Meunier, 1904
 † Winnertzia bellata Fedotova, 2005
 † Winnertzia cylindrica Meunier, 1904
 † Winnertzia isotoma Fedotova, 2005
 † Winnertzia kapustini Fedotova & Perkovsky, 2008
 † Winnertzia radiata Meunier, 1904
 † Winnertzia recusata Fedotova & Perkovsky, 2008
 † Winnertzia separata Meunier, 1904
 † Winnertziola burmitica (Cockerell, 1917) Burmese amber, Myanmar, Cenomanian

References

Further reading

External links

Cecidomyiidae genera
Articles created by Qbugbot